NHPS may refer to:

 New Haven Public Schools, Connecticut
 National Health Protection Scheme in India
 Newbridge Heights Public School,  New South Wales, Australia